The 2009 European Youth Summer Olympic Festival was held in Tampere, Finland.

Sports

Mascot
The mascot for the 2009 European Youth Olympic Festival is Finx, a Eurasian lynx.

Venues
Eight venues were used in this edition of European Youth Olympic Festival.

Participating nations

Medal table

References

External links
2009 EYOF results
2009 EYOF athletics records

 
European Youth Summer Olympic Festival
European Youth Summer Olympic Festival
European Youth Summer Olympic Festival
European Youth Summer Olympic Festival
Multi-sport events in Finland
Sports competitions in Tampere
Youth sport in Finland
2009 in youth sport
July 2009 sports events in Europe